is a passenger railway station located in Seya-ku, Yokohama, Japan, operated by the private railway operator Sagami Railway (Sotetsu).

Lines 
Seya Station is served by the Sagami Railway Main Line, and lies 15.5 kilometers from the starting point of the line at Yokohama Station.

Station layout
The station consists of two island platforms. The station building is elevated, and located above the platforms and tracks.

Platforms

Adjacent stations

History
Seya Station was opened on May 12, 1926 as a station of the Jinchū Railway, the predecessor to the current Sagami Railway Main Line. The current station building was completed on March 28, 2004.

Passenger statistics
In fiscal 2019, the station was used by an average of 44,085 passengers daily.

The passenger figures for previous years are as shown below.

Surrounding area
 Yokohama City Seya Junior High School
 Yokohama City Seya Elementary School
 Seya Special Education School
 Yokohama City Seya Library
 Yokohama City Seya District Center
 Yokohama City Seya Sports Center

See also
 List of railway stations in Japan

References

External links 

 Official home page  

Railway stations in Kanagawa Prefecture
Railway stations in Japan opened in 1926
Railway stations in Yokohama